Joe van Niekerk is a former Italian rugby union player of South African origin who played all of his senior career in Italy. After retirement he became a rugby coach at Borsari Badia.

Club career
In 2007 Joe van Niekerk joined Venezia Mestre where he played for the club's U20 team for two seasons and then moved to play for the 1st team. In 2010 he joined Rovigo where he spent the rest of his career. In 2014 he played 2 matches for Benetton Treviso. In 2019 he retired from rugby at the age of 28.

International career
In 2012 Joe van Niekerk played 2 matches for Italy A.

Coaching career
After retirement Joe van Niekerk became a coach of youth teams at Borsari Badia in 2019. In 2020 he became a senior team coach at Borsari Badia.

References

External links
 Itsrugby profile
 EPCR profile
 Pro12 profile

1989 births
Living people
Italian rugby union players
Rugby union players from Bloemfontein
Rugby union centres